Russia first competed at the 1993 World Championships, after the fall of the Soviet Union.  The Russian women won their first team gold in 2010 and the men won their first team gold in 2019.  In 2021 Russian athletes competed as the Russian Gymnastics Federation (RGF) due to sanctions in place against Russian sports.  Russia was banned from participating at the 2022 World Championships due to the 2022 Russian invasion of Ukraine.

Medalists

Medal tables

By gender

By event

Junior World medalists

See also 
 Russia men's national artistic gymnastics team
 Russia women's national artistic gymnastics team
 List of Olympic male artistic gymnasts for Russia
 List of Olympic female artistic gymnasts for Russia

References 

World Artistic Gymnastics Championships
Gymnastics in Russia